Oloya is a surname. Notable people with the surname include:

Moses Oloya (born 1992), Ugandan footballer
Opiyo Oloya (born 1958), Ugandan-born Canadian educator and author